Dicterias is a monotypic genus of damselflies in the family Dicteriadidae. It contains the single species Dicterias atrosanguinea, which is known commonly as the red bareleg. It is endemic to Brazil. It occurs on the banks of the Amazon River.

References

Calopterygoidea
Endemic fauna of Brazil
Monotypic Odonata genera
Zygoptera genera
Taxonomy articles created by Polbot